The Isle of Disenchantment is the self-released debut album by Australian technical death metal band Psycroptic. It was released in 2001.

Track listing

Personnel
 Matthew Chalk - Vocals
 Joe Haley - Guitar
 Cameron Grant - Bass
 Dave Haley - Drums

References

2000 debut albums
Psycroptic albums